Fadi Nahas (Born in December 1957) is a Lebanese Businessman and Philanthropist also running in the 2022 Lebanese general elections.

Early life 
He started his career at 15 with the energy company "Total" before traveling and setting up a conglomerate of companies in the Caucasus, Central Asian and Middle Eastern region.
.

Work 
In the 1980s he set up a network in Turkey for a cold chain company in a joint venture with the leading company "Dole". Later he applied the same concept to the countries of the Balkan region to become the hub for distribution in a joint venture with "Sadia", "Tyson Foods" and  Dole. The latter will later acquire his company Distrifruit in Romania. Meanwhile, he was the Consul General of Ecuador in Turkey from 1998 until 2020.

Boards 
Excellence in Leadership 2005 (OAS)

Humanitarian Rose Award (Princess Diana's Kensington 2006)

Orden Nacional "Al Merito" (Ecuador 2019)

Ordre National du Merite ( Lebanon 2005) Board member Fondation Chirac 

Founding board member Endeavor Turkey

Member of board of Trustees Beirut International Marathon 

Founding board member "Himaya" 

Founder of Act for Lebanon 

Founder  of Lebanon 2020

Founder of "Wayyak"

Awards 
Ecuador’s “Oficial de la Orden Nacional Al Merito », 2020 

“Those Who Inspire”, Lebanon, 2018 

Princess Diana Humanitarian Rose Award, 2006 

OAS Inter-American Economic Council Excellence in Leadership Award, 2005 

Lebanese Order of Merit, 2005

References 

1957 births
Living people
Lebanese Melkite Greek Catholics
Lebanese businesspeople
Lebanese philanthropists